Binyamina-Giv'at Ada is a town in the Haifa District of Israel. It is the result of the 2003 merger between the two local councils of Binyamina and Giv'at Ada. Prior to the merger, the population of Binyamina was 6,600.

History

Binyamina
Binyamina was founded in 1922. At first the proposed name for the Moshava was "Tel Binyamin", but as the nearby British railway station was called Binyamina railway station, which itself was named after the Baron Edmond Benjamin James de Rothschild, the inhabitants chose to call it Binyamina. According to the Jewish National Fund, Binyamina was founded on PICA land by members of the Third Aliyah and people from the neighboring Zikhron Ya'akov . According to a census conducted in 1922 by the British Mandate authorities, Binyamina had a population of 153 inhabitants, consisting of 137 Jews, 13 Muslims and 3 Christians. In 1946 the Betar Tower and Stockade settlement (which was relocated multiple times) "Nahalat Jabotinsky", named after Ze'ev Jabotinsky became, municipally, a part of Binyamina. The original economy of the village was citrus-based. In 1947, Binyamina had a population of 2000.

Giv'at Ada

Giv'at Ada, named for Baron Edmond James de Rothschild's wife Adelaid (Ada), was established in 1903 by eight families from Zikhron Ya'akov. Giv'at Ada was established as an agricultural settlement. The main farming branches were field crops and vegetables, and later, grapes.

Merger 
The two local councils, Binyamina and Givat Ada, were merged into one authority as part of an initiative by the Ministry of the Interior regarding the unification of local authorities in Israel. The unification was done in 2003 as part of the plan for the revival of the Israeli economy. From the beginning, there was an intention to unite the three settlements into one authority: Zichron Ya'akov, Binyamina, and Givat Ada. Finally it was decided in the Knesset on July 31, 2003 to unify Binyamina and Givat Ada only.

Economy

The area is home to both the Binyamina Winery, producers of 2.8 million bottles of wine annually, and the Tishbi Winery, founded by Yonathan Tishbi in 1985. Tishbi now produces one million bottles annually. Plans have been drawn up to build a  wine park on the slopes between Binyamina and Zichron Ya'akov to promote wine tourism in Israel.

Transport 
The busy Israel Railways Binyamina Railway Station is the last stop on the Binyamina-Tel Aviv suburban line and a transfer point on the Tel Aviv-Haifa intercity line which makes it a transportation hub for the area. A direct non-stop train from Binyamina reaches Tel Aviv or Haifa in 30 minutes.

Population 
According to the data of the Central Bureau of Statistics, as of the end of January 2023 (estimate), 16,343 residents live in Binyamina-Givat Ada (124th place in the ranking of local authorities in Israel). The population is growing at an annual growth rate of 1.8%. The percentage of those entitled to a Bagrut certificate among 12th grade students in the year 2020-2021 was 88.1%. The average monthly salary of an employee during the year 2019 was 13,552 NIS (national average: 9,745 NIS).

Notable residents
Binyamina is the birthplace of the Israeli songwriter Ehud Manor, and is referenced in a number of his songs. It is also the birthplace of the 12th Israeli Prime Minister Ehud Olmert, and basketball player Adi Gordon. Amongst it's current residents are famous TV actor Lior Halfon, former Maccabi Haifa F.C. Maor Buzaglo

Sister cities 
 Tokaj, Hungary

References 

 
Former local councils in Israel
Populated places established in 1922
Jewish villages in the Ottoman Empire
Jewish villages in Mandatory Palestine
Local councils in Haifa District